Rajeev Ram and Joe Salisbury defeated Tim Pütz and Michael Venus in the final, 7–6(7–4), 7–6(7–5) to win the men's doubles tennis title at the 2022 Cincinnati Masters.

Marcel Granollers and Horacio Zeballos were the defending champions, but lost in the quarterfinals to Pütz and Venus.

Salisbury and Neal Skupski were in contention for the ATP no. 1 doubles ranking at the beginning of the tournament. Salisbury retained the top ranking after Skupski lost in the second round.

Seeds
The top four seeds received a bye into the second round.

Draw

Finals

Top half

Bottom half

Seeded teams
The following are the seeded teams, based on ATP rankings as of August 8, 2022.

Other entry information

Wild cards

Protected ranking

Alternates
  Roberto Bautista Agut /  Marcelo Melo

Withdrawals
  Carlos Alcaraz /  Pablo Carreño Busta → replaced by  Roberto Bautista Agut /  Marcelo Melo

References

External links
Main draw

Men's Doubles